Julie Won (born April 17, 1990) is a Korean American politician from New York City. She is a member of the New York City Council for the 26th district, which covers the western Queens neighborhoods of Sunnyside, Long Island City, Woodside, and Astoria.

Early life and education
Won was born in South Korea and immigrated with her family to Queens in 1998, when she was eight years old. Her parents, who had left their jobs in South Korea after the 1997 Asian financial crisis, both worked in local small businesses. Won received her undergraduate degree from the Maxwell School of Citizenship and Public Affairs at Syracuse University.

Career
Prior to entering politics, Won spent most of her career as a consultant at IBM.

2021 City Council campaign
In October 2020, Won announced her 2021 campaign for the 26th district of the New York City Council, held by term-limited Democrat Jimmy Van Bramer. Won had been serving as a member of Queens Community Board 2 for most of the year, and cited the difficulties her family faced due to the COVID-19 pandemic as the reason for her campaign. Ideologically a progressive, Won emphasized her work in the technology sector and her support for citywide free WiFi, alongside other left-wing policy priorities.

Won faced 14 other candidates in the Democratic primary, many of whom also ran on progressive platforms, with no clear frontrunner among them. In part because of the size and volatility of the field, many would-be endorsers chose to remain on the sidelines, while others – including Van Bramer and the influential Working Families Party – coalesced around New York City Census deputy director Amit Singh Bagga.

On election night, Won finished neck-and-neck with Bagga, receiving 18.5 percent of the vote to Bagga's 17.7 percent; every other candidate lagged behind in the single digits. Won received a major boost, however, when absentee ballots and ranked-choice votes were counted, and prevailed over Bagga 57-43% in the 15th round of ranked-choice tabulation; she formally declared victory on July 6. She faced minimal opposition in the November general election, and won easily.

Personal life
Won lives in Sunnyside, Queens, with her husband.

See also
 Korean Americans in New York City

References

Living people
1990 births
Asian-American New York City Council members
Politicians from Queens, New York
Maxwell School of Citizenship and Public Affairs alumni
IBM employees
New York (state) Democrats
American women of Korean descent in politics
South Korean emigrants to the United States
Asian-American people in New York (state) politics
21st-century American women politicians
21st-century American politicians
Women New York City Council members
New York City Council members